Birtalan is a Hungarian surname. Notable people with the surname include:

Ákos Birtalan (1962–2011), Romanian economist and politician
Balázs Birtalan (1969–2016), Hungarian writer, poet, publicist and psychotherapist
Botond Birtalan (born 1989), Hungarian footballer
Ștefan Birtalan (born 1948), Romanian handball player

Hungarian-language surnames